The 2009–10 Israeli Basketball State Cup was the 50th edition of the Israeli Basketball State Cup, organized by the Israel Basketball Association. 26 teams participated in the competition. The semifinals and finals was played at the Yad Eliyahu Arena in Tel Aviv.

Preliminary round
4 Liga Leumit teams have been drawn to play a preliminary round to earn a spot in the main draw.

Main draw
Following IBA's rules, the current champions, Maccabi Tel Aviv, and the cup holders, Hapoel Holon, have been drawn straight into the quarterfinals, into different halves of the draw. Two other random teams, Hapoel Jerusalem and Maccabi Haifa, have been drawn straight into the second round.

See also
2009–10 Israeli Basketball Super League
Israeli Basketball State Cup

2009-10
State Cup